Marcelle Monthil (8 June 1892 – 8 November 1950) was a French film actress.

Born Marcelle Madeleine Montalenti in the Principality of  Monaco, she died in Paris.

Selected filmography
 Love Songs (1930)
 When Love Is Over (1931)
 His Best Client (1932)
 The Three Musketeers (1932)
 Cognasse (1932)
 To the Polls, Citizens (1932)
 Roger la Honte (1933)
 Miquette (1934)
 The Land That Dies (1936)
 A Picnic on the Grass (1937)
 Beating Heart (1940)
 Péchés de jeunesse (1941)
 The Benefactor (1942)
 The Blue Veil (1942)
 The White Waltz (1943)
 The London Man (1943)
 The White Truck (1943)
 Children of Paradise (1945)
 Night Warning (1946)
 Last Refuge (1947)
 The Last Vacation (1948)
 The Heart on the Sleeve (1948)
 Marlène (1949)
 Last Love (1949)
 Le trésor des Pieds-Nickelés (1950)
 The Girl from Maxim's (1950)

External links

1892 births
1950 deaths
French film actresses
French silent film actresses
Monegasque film actresses
20th-century French actresses